Miloslav Kříž (29 May 1924 – 20 May 2013) was a Czech professional basketball player and coach. As a player, he played first for Uncas Prague, and later for Sparta Prague, but he was better known as a head coach and trainer, especially as the head coach of the senior Czechoslovakian women's national team. He was awarded the FIBA Order of Merit, for his services to basketball, in 2002.

Playing career
Kříž played for Uncas Prague, from 1940 to 1943, leaving to join BC Sparta Prague, in 1944, where he remained until 1948.

Coaching career
While still a player at Sparta Prague, Kříž began coaching both the club's women's team (from 1945), and men's team (from 1947). He finished in both of those roles in 1950, moving on to coach ATK Praha, for one season. In 1953, he returned to Sparta Prague, coaching the women's team for 11 years.

During the same period, Kříž was also the head coach of the senior Czechoslovak Women's National Team, from 1946 to 1948, and again, from 1960 to 1968. The team finished third in the 1967 FIBA World Championship for Women. They were also runners-up in the EuroBasket Women 1962 and the EuroBasket Women 1966, and finished third at the EuroBasket Women 1964. 

Kříž then moved to Germany, where from 1968 to 1971, he was the head coach of the senior German Men's National Team, and also of VfL Osnabrück, who were the men's club champions of Germany in 1969. He also coached the FIBA European Selection teams, between 1964 and 1968.

Basketball administration

Czechoslovakia
Kříž was also active in a variety of basketball organisations. Within Czechoslovakia, he was a member of the board of the Czechoslovak Volleyball and Basketball Federation (1946–51), President of DSO Spartak (1953–56), and leader of the Czechoslovak Basketball Federation's International Commission (1956–68). From 1973 until 1986, he was President of the Czech Basketball Federation, and Vice-President of the Czechoslovak Basketball Federation. From 1990 until 1993, he was the President of Sparta Prague, and made Honorary President thereafter.

FIBA
Internationally, Kříž held a number of positions within FIBA. He was a member of staff for the European zone, from 1956–68, and again from 1973–80, as well as a member of the FIBA European Cups commission, from 1972–76 and from 1990–94. From 1980–90, he was a member of FIBA World, and President of the Women's Commission, and from 1994 until 2000, he was FIBA Commissioner, presiding over 678 games in total.

Later career
Between 1970 and 1985, Kříž was the chief of the sports section at the Czechoslovak press agency. In his later career, he practiced law.

See also
 FIBA All-Star Games
 Czechoslovak Women's Basketball Championship
 FIBA EuroBasket Women
 BLC Sparta Prague

References

Czech basketball coaches
Czech men's basketball players
1924 births
2013 deaths
Czechoslovak men's basketball players
Czechoslovak basketball coaches